The Lambda Literary Award for Gay Fiction is an annual literary award, presented by the Lambda Literary Foundation to a work of fiction on gay male themes. As the award is presented based on themes in the work, not the sexuality or gender of the writer, women and heterosexual men may also be nominated for or win the award.

Recipients

References

External links

 Lambda Literary Awards

Gay
Lists of LGBT-related award winners and nominees
Awards established in 1989
English-language literary awards